The 1998 UST Growling Tigers men's basketball team represented University of Santo Tomas in the 61st season of the University Athletic Association of the Philippines. The men's basketball tournament for the school year 1998–99 began on July 11, 1998, and the host school for the season was the University of the East.

The Tigers ended the double round-robin eliminations with seven wins and seven losses. The UE Red Warriors and the UP Fighting Maroons had the same win–loss record, but UE was ranked higher due to a superior quotient. This left UST to contend with UP in a playoff game for the remaining fourth Final Four slot. The two teams split their elimination round games, with the Tigers winning the first round in overtime, and the Maroons getting payback in the next round with an 80–78 win. UST won the playoff with an eight-point lead at 80–72 and had once again faced the De La Salle Green Archers for the second straight year in the semifinal round. They earlier defeated the Green Archers in the second round of eliminations to give them their only loss of the season.

In the Final Four, the Tigers took away La Salle's twice-to-beat advantage with a 55–51 win to extend the series to a deciding Game 2. The concluding match saw eleven lead changes until La Salle's Renren Ritualo drove and converted from the baseline to bring UST down by three points. The Tigers were unable to score as they committed a series of turnovers. They eventually lost at 51–56, sending La Salle to the Finals.

Veteran forward Richard Yee, who had averaged 13.1 points per gane was selected to the Mythical second team during the presentation of individual awards.

Roster

Depth chart

Roster changes
The Tigers lost four of their players from the 1994–96 champion squads to departures, as Henry Ong and Romel David had already graduated. Richard Melencio and Chandler Donaldson, meanwhile were signed to teams in the newly-formed Metropolitan Basketball Association to play professionally.

Subtractions

Additions

Schedule and results

Elimination games were played in a double round-robin format. All games were aired on PTV 4 and SBN 21 by Silverstar Sports.

Awards

Players drafted into the PBA
Richard Yee was picked fifth in the first round of the 1999 PBA draft by the Derrick Pumaren-led Purefoods Tender Juicy Hotdogs team on January 16, 1999. Gerard Francisco was also selected in the same rookie draft as the tenth overall pick by the Adonis Tierra-coached Sta. Lucia Realtors.

Dale Singson joined the Iloilo Megavoltz in the MBA from 1999 until the middle of the 2000 season after a buyout deal by the Shell Velocity team which sent him to the PBA during the 2000 All-Filipino Cup eliminations.

References

UST Growling Tigers basketball team seasons
UAAP Season 61